Ossie Phillips (born in Victoria) was an Australian jockey who was best known for riding Wotan to victory in the 1936 Melbourne Cup.

References

Year of death missing
Year of birth missing
People from Victoria (Australia)
Australian jockeys